The brook barbel (Barbus caninus') is a species of ray-finned fish in the  family Cyprinidae. It is found in Italy and Switzerland. Its natural habitat is rivers. It is threatened by habitat degradation and by competition from the introduced B. barbus and B. graellsi''.

References

caninus
Freshwater fish of Europe
Fish described in 1839
Taxa named by Charles Lucien Bonaparte
Taxonomy articles created by Polbot